Eighth World (stylized as EIGHth WØRlD) is Misia's eighth studio album and first since signing back with BMG Japan, released on January 9, 2008. It includes the singles "Any Love" and "Royal Chocolate Flush" as well as the J-Wave Winter Campaign Holy December, Be in Love with J-Wave image song and theme song to the Japanese release of the movie Bridge to Terabithia, "To Be in Love". The first pressing of the album came in a sleeve case packaging.

The album is certified Gold for shipment of 100,000 copies.

Title
The title "Eighth World" was chosen because of the coinciding year of release and number of the album. Moreover, with the Kanji for eight, 八 (hachi), resembling a folding fan spreading out, and the symbol for Infinity, ∞, being similar to the number 8 flipped on its side, the message conveyed in the title is that "an infinite amount of happiness is spreading out in the eighth world of Misia".

Information
With her previous album, Ascension, focusing on the vast theme of  "life" and "birth", Misia entered production of Eighth World with the idea of incorporating this element in a more tangible way. The album reflects a more up close and personal theme, with lyrics about relationships and the many sceneries Misia encountered in her homeland as well as in Kenya, where she visited the Kibera slum in Nairobi. In an interview with MSN Music, she explained:

"Last spring, I visited Kenya and the reality of their conditions I saw in the slums was harsher than I had imagined. It made me think over a lot of things. It made me want to sing about "real" issues and with that in mind, one of the first songs I wrote right after was "Any Love"."

"Taiyō no Malaika" is another song Misia wrote during her stay in Africa. A performance of the song was captured in a documentary of Misia's visit. She explained the crowd's reaction, saying, "The words are in Japanese, so naturally, I didn't think they would understand. However, as I sang, I saw the mothers crying as they listened. That's when I realized firsthand that music has no borders and transcends language." The song "Ishin Denshin", which was written by essayist Mayumi Satō to Misia's demand, speaks of this realization.

Track listing

Charts

Oricon Sales Chart

Physical Sales Charts

References

External links
Misia Official Web Site
Eighth World Official Page

2008 albums
Misia albums
Japanese-language albums
Sony Music Entertainment Japan albums